Lisette Teunissen (born 18 February 1986) is a retired Dutch Paralympic swimmer.

She represented the Netherlands at the 2008 Summer Paralympics, 2012 Summer Paralympics and 2016 Summer Paralympics.

She won the gold medal in the women's 50 metre backstroke S4 event at the 2012 Summer Paralympics held in London, United Kingdom and the bronze medal in the women's 50 metre backstroke S3 at the 2016 Summer Paralympics held in Rio de Janeiro, Brazil.

At the 2015 IPC Swimming World Championships held in Glasgow, United Kingdom, she won the gold medal in the women's 50 metre backstroke S4 event. She also won the gold medal in the women's 100 metre freestyle S3 event. She set new world records in both events.

She announced her retirement from competitive swimming in March 2018.

References

External links 
 

Living people
1986 births
Swimmers from Rotterdam
Dutch female backstroke swimmers
Dutch female freestyle swimmers
Swimmers at the 2008 Summer Paralympics
Swimmers at the 2012 Summer Paralympics
Swimmers at the 2016 Summer Paralympics
Paralympic gold medalists for the Netherlands
Paralympic bronze medalists for the Netherlands
Paralympic medalists in swimming
Medalists at the 2012 Summer Paralympics
Medalists at the 2016 Summer Paralympics
Paralympic swimmers of the Netherlands
Medalists at the World Para Swimming Championships
S4-classified Paralympic swimmers
21st-century Dutch women